Mwe or m.w.e. may refer to:
Meter water equivalent, a unit of nuclear and particle physics
MWe ("megawatt electrical"), a unit of electric power used in the electric power industry
Mwe (town), a settlement in Kenya's Eastern Province
Minimal working example
6 MWE = "Six Million Weren't Enough", an anti-semitic slogan associated with the Proud Boys